Pedro Altamiranda is a Panamanian singer and composer known for his Carnival songs. Altamiranda sings about the culture and politics of Panama using humorous Panamanian slang. This attracts the attention of crowds, not only of adults but also young people who identify with his songs. Gilberto Santa Rosa, in his song "Navidad En Panama", mentions Altamiranda as part of Panamanian culture.

Altamiranda started writing songs in 1979. Many of his political songs have been controversial, some of them censored by different governments including the Manuel Noriega dictatorship.  In 1984 the song "Lecciones" was censored because it is about the electoral fraud that year. With his burlesque songs, he attacked the oppression of Panamanians.  In February 2004, one week before Carnival, Altamiranda released the controversial "La Doña", a satire of Mireya Moscoso.

Most of his songs are influenced by Calypso music, salsa, and the Carnival Brass and Drum bands of Las Tablas, also known as Murgas.

He also composed a song about the former President of Panama, Martín Torrijos, named  "Catín le dijo a Martín" (Catin told Martin), which talked about how the President and the Finance Minister supposedly planned the new controversial tax law.

Some phrases in Pedro's songs, have become part of the Panamanian culture, among them:

"...Para las Tablas to Rass"
"...Nos Vemos en las Cómicas"
"...Juega Vivo!"
"...Guaro y Campana"

External links
El Buhonero Video
 Lyrics La Doña

See also
List of Panamanians

Living people
Panamanian composers
Male composers
20th-century Panamanian male singers
20th-century Panamanian singers
Year of birth missing (living people)
Place of birth missing (living people)
21st-century Panamanian male singers
21st-century Panamanian singers